Jean-Pierre Emile Boeres (1890–1944) was a Luxembourg composer, organist and choir master.

Born on 13 November 1890 in Luxembourg City, he wrote operettas and musical comedies in Luxembourgish. In 1934, he founded the Wiener Operette and the Lëtzebuerger Musekerverband. He also contributed to the Lëtzebuerger Revue.

During the German occupation, the Théâtre des Capucins put on operas, ballets and plays in German but the German authorities were very wary of productions in Luxembourgish which were considered anti-German. On 18 November 1940, Boeres' operetta Wann d'Blieder falen (When the leaves fall) enjoyed a huge success as the audience sought to show its support for a free Luxembourg by attending a performance in the Luxembourg language.

Boeres died in Luxembourg City on 18 August 1944 after a cycling accident.

Works
1935: "Fre'johr"
1936: "Spuenescht Blutt"
1936: "Wann d'Blieder falen"
1937: "Landstroosselidd"
1939: "Den éiwege Wee"
1941: "D'Wonner vu Spe'sbech"

References

1890 births
1944 deaths
20th-century composers
20th-century male musicians
Luxembourgian composers
Male composers
People from Luxembourg City
Cycling road incident deaths
Road incident deaths in Luxembourg